Sherif Ekramy Ahmed Ahmed El-Shahat (born 10 July 1983) is an Egyptian footballer who plays as a goalkeeper for Pyramids FC and the Egyptian national team.

An Al Ahly youth product, Ekramy moved to Dutch club Feyenoord in 2005. At Feyenoord he received little playing time and was loaned to Ankaragücü in 2008. After four years at Feyenoord he returned to Egypt signing with El Gouna FC, whom he helped win promotion to the top flight for the 2009–10 season. He returned to Al Ahly in 2010, where he stayed for ten years. In 2020, he joined Pyramids FC.

Ekramy participated in two successive World Youth cups, the 2001 in Argentina, where he was part of the bronze-medal team, and the 2003 instalment in the United Arab Emirates. He is the son of Ekramy El-Shahat.

Club career

Al Ahly
Ekramy was one of the most promising youngster in Al Ahly youth department so he was promoted for the first team in 2002 at the age of 19 although he never played for the first team until 2004. His amazing performance as a captain with Egypt U-20 in 2003 African Youth Championship helping The Young Pharaohs to win the title so he received a lot of offers but he decided finally to join Feyenoord to be alongside his former team-mate Hossam Ghaly

Feyenoord
Ekramy's spell in the Netherlands was not very successful. Although signed as a great talent, he was usually a reserve keeper.

On 11 February 2007, he played his first Eredivisie match for Feyenoord against FC Twente. With the club he only played seven matches in three years helping them to win the 2007–08 KNVB Cup in his last season.

Return to Al-Ahly
Ekramy rejoined Al-Ahly in 2010 until 2020, where he managed to win 21 domestic and continental titles.

Pyramids
In June 2020, Ekramy joined Egyptian Premier League rivals Pyramids FC.

International career
In May 2018, he was named in Egypt’s preliminary squad for the 2018 FIFA World Cup in Russia.

Career statistics

Club

International

Honours and achievements
Al Ahly
 Egyptian Premier League: 2009–10, 2010–11, 2013–14, 2015–16, 2016–17, 2017–18, 2018–19
 Egypt Cup: 2016–17, 2019–20
 Egyptian Super Cup: 2010, 2014, 2015, 2017, 2018
 CAF Champions League: 2012, 2013
 CAF Confederation Cup: 2014
 CAF Super Cup: 2013, 2014

Feyenoord
 KNVB Cup: 2007–08

References

External links

Footballers from Cairo
1983 births
Living people
Egyptian footballers
Association football goalkeepers
Eredivisie players
Egyptian Premier League players
Süper Lig players
Al Ahly SC players
Feyenoord players
MKE Ankaragücü footballers
El Gouna FC players
Pyramids FC players
Egypt international footballers
2017 Africa Cup of Nations players
2018 FIFA World Cup players
Egyptian expatriate footballers
Expatriate footballers in the Netherlands
Expatriate footballers in Turkey